World Party were a British musical group, which was essentially the solo project of its sole member, Karl Wallinger. He started the band in 1986 in London after leaving the Waterboys.

Career
After a stint as musical director of a West End performance of The Rocky Horror Picture Show, Karl Wallinger joined a funk band called "The Out", before joining Mike Scott's Waterboys in 1984 to record the album A Pagan Place. After their third album in 1985, This Is the Sea, Wallinger departed to form World Party.

Recorded at Wallinger's home in 1986, his debut album Private Revolution yielded two minor hits in the UK, "Private Revolution" and "Ship of Fools".  "Ship of Fools", however, did much better outside the UK – it reached No. 4 in Australia, No. 21 in New Zealand, and No. 27 in the US, in the process becoming the act's only major international hit.

Between World Party's first and second albums, Wallinger aided Sinéad O'Connor in recording her 1988 debut, The Lion and the Cobra.  O'Connor, then an unknown, had appeared as a guest on World Party's first album. She would go on to appear as a guest on the second LP as well.

Goodbye Jumbo, World Party's second album, contained the minor UK hit singles "Way Down Now" and "Put the Message in the Box". Wallinger collaborated with fellow songwriter Guy Chambers on some of the tracks. Goodbye Jumbo was voted "album of the year" by Q magazine and was nominated for a Grammy Award for "best alternative music performance" in the US.

After the 1991 EP Thank You World, Wallinger recruited guitarist David Catlin-Birch and ex-Icicle Works drummer Chris Sharrock as fully-fledged members for 1993's album Bang!. It reached No. 2 on the UK Albums Chart, with the track, "Is It Like Today?" (No. 19 on the UK Singles Chart) also becoming a moderately successful single in Europe. Following the success of Bang!, World Party appeared at the Glastonbury Festival in 1994, at which they had previously played in 1987 and 1990.

In 1994, World Party recorded "When You Come Back to Me" for the Reality Bites soundtrack, influenced by David Bowie's 1975 song "Young Americans". Catlin-Birch left shortly afterwards.

Their fourth album, Egyptology (1997), written following the death of Wallinger's mother, was commercially unsuccessful, although "She's the One" won an Ivor Novello Award and was subsequently recorded by Robbie Williams. Sharrock left the group after the recording of this album, leaving Wallinger on his own. Wallinger took a three-year break from World Party, before the release of Dumbing Up in 2000. However, in February 2001 he suffered an aneurysm that left him unable to speak.

After a five-year rehabilitation, in 2006 Wallinger re-emerged onto the scene. With his back catalogue reclaimed from EMI, a distribution deal was agreed (via his own Seaview label) with Universal, and he played his first live show in a decade at the South by Southwest festival in Texas, US. He played additional US dates in 2006 including the Bonnaroo Festival in Tennessee. Big Blue Ball, a joint project with Peter Gabriel with production work by Stephen Hague was also released.

In September 2007, World Party supported Steely Dan in their first tour of Australia. The Best in Show compilation was released to celebrate the Australian tour.

In 2009, World Party toured the west coast of the US, and appeared at Seattle's Bumbershoot Festival and San Francisco's Hardly Strictly Bluegrass Festival.

In 2012, World Party released a new five-CD/70-song collection of new songs, live recordings and cover versions titled Arkeology to critical acclaim. The band toured extensively in America in 2012, and toured England for the first time in 12 years, ending with an appearance in November 2012 in London at the Royal Albert Hall.

Live dates and tours followed through 2015, and a 2013 UK show was issued as a 2-CD set called World Party – Live!.  World Party has not toured, released new material, or updated their website since the end of their 2015 North American tour.

Members
Karl Wallinger – vocals, guitars, keyboards, bass, drums, programming (1986–2015)
David Catlin-Birch- guitars, bass (1992–1995)
 Chris Sharrock- drums, percussion (1992–1997)

Music
Wallinger cites influences such as the Beatles, Bob Dylan, the Beach Boys, Junior Walker, Neil Young and Prince. He sings and plays most of the instruments himself, using multi-tracking to create the studio sound. Lyrically, many of his songs feature thoughtful and occasionally political sentiments.

Discography

Studio albums

Live albums
 World Party Live! (2014) (recorded live at the Picturedrome, Holmfirth, UK, April 2013)

Compilation albums
 Best in Show (2007) (greatest hits compilation)
 Arkeology (2012) (5-CD/70 song set of new songs, demos, outtakes, B-sides, alternate mixes, live tracks and radio sessions)

Singles

Other contributions
Acoustic 05 (2005, Echo) – "She's the One"

References

Musical groups established in 1986
Ivor Novello Award winners
English alternative rock groups
British musical trios
1986 establishments in the United Kingdom
Chrysalis Records artists
Musical groups from London